Diana Baciu (born 26 March 1994) is a Moldovan chess player. She received the FIDE title of Woman International Master (WIM) in 2013. She won the Moldovan Women's Chess Championship in 2009.

Biography
In the 2000s Diana Baciu repeatedly represented Moldova at the European Youth Chess Championships and World Youth Chess Championships in different age groups, where she won three medals: 
 gold (in 2011, at the European Youth Chess Championship in the U18 girls age group);
 bronze (in 2006, at the World Youth Chess Championship in the U12 girls age group); 
 bronze (in 2008, at the World Youth Chess Championship in the U14 girls age group).

She successfully participated in Moldovan Women's Chess Championships, where:
 in 2007 shared 2nd-3rd place, 
 in 2008 won silver, 
 in 2009 became champion,
 in 2010 won bronze .

Baciu played for Moldova in the Women's Chess Olympiads:
 In 2010, at fourth board in the 39th Chess Olympiad (women) in Khanty-Mansiysk (+5, =4, -1),
 In 2012, at second board in the 40th Chess Olympiad (women) in Istanbul (+5, =4, -2),
 In 2014, at first board in the 41st Chess Olympiad (women) in Tromsø (+4, =2, -4),
 In 2016, at first board in the 42nd Chess Olympiad (women) in Baku (+5, =2, -3),
 In 2018, at first board in the 43rd Chess Olympiad (women) in Batumi (+4, =3, -3).

In 2013, she was awarded the FIDE Woman International Master (WIM) title.

References

External links
 
 
 

1994 births
Living people
Moldovan female chess players
Chess Woman International Masters
Chess Olympiad competitors